Bowness-on-Windermere is a town in the South Lakeland district of Cumbria, England. It lies next to Windermere lake and the town of Windermere to the north east with which it forms the civil parish of Windermere and Bowness. The town was historically part of the county of Westmorland and is also forms an urban area with Windermere. The town had a population of 3,814 in the 2011 Census.

Etymology
'Bowness' (originally 'Bulnes') means " 'the headland where the bull grazes', from OE 'bula', 'bull' and OE 'næss' 'headland', perhaps referring to the keeping of the parish bull." The 'on-Windermere' part was added later (found on the Ordnance Survey map of 1899), presumably to distinguish this 'Bowness' from other Cumbrian ones. ('OE' = Old English).

History
The town's ancient parish church of St Martin was built in 1483 but of an older foundation. The former rectory is said to have been built in 1415.

A grammar school was founded in about 1600. A new building was opened in 1836, funded by local landowner John Bolton of Storrs Hall. The foundation stone was laid by William Wordsworth.

During the 19th century, Bowness grew from a small fishing village to a town living almost entirely off tourism and holiday homes. It was the centre of the boat-building industry that provided the sailing yachts, rowing boats and steam launches used on the lake. A large number of hotels and boarding houses gave employment to the permanent population of the town. Queen Adelaide visited Bowness in 1840, staying at the Royal Hotel. The arrival of the railway in 1847 in Windermere (the residents of Bowness had opposed a station in their own town) provided much of the momentum for the growth.

Bowness-on-Windermere became a civil parish in 1894 and an urban district council was formed for the town at the same time. In 1905, the council merged with that of Windermere, and the two civil parishes merged on 1 April 1974 under the name of Windermere. The civil parish of Windermere is governed by a town council, Windermere and Bowness Town Council.

Transport
Both Stagecoach and the local council provide frequent connecting buses from Bowness Pier; Stagecoach's open-top double-decker buses travel through the centre of town and continue to Ambleside and Grasmere, while the council's wheelchair-accessible minibuses run around the edge of town. The Windermere Ferry, a car carrying cable ferry, connects Bowness at Ferry Nab on the eastern side of the lake with Ferry House Far Sawrey on the western side of the lake, a trip of approximately 10 minutes. For those looking for a more leisurely way to travel, Windermere Lake Cruises operate regular lake cruises running from Bowness Bay to the north end of the lake at Ambleside and south end at Fell Foot.

Media
Readers of Arthur Ransome's Swallows and Amazons series of books will recognise Bowness as the lakeside town of 'Rio'. The collection at the Windermere Steamboat Museum on Rayrigg Road includes TSSY Esperance, 1869; one of the iron steamboats on which Ransome modelled Captain Flint's houseboat.  Bowness-on-Windermere is also home to The World of Beatrix Potter attraction, opened in July 1991 by Victoria Wood.

See also

 Listed buildings in Windermere, Cumbria (town)

References

External links

Windermere Town Council
Cumbria County History Trust: Windermere and Bowness
Bowness-on-Windermere guide

Populated places in Cumbria
Former civil parishes in Cumbria
Westmorland
Windermere, Cumbria